Perambalur is a municipality in the state of Tamil Nadu (Republic of India). It is the seat of Perambalur District/County and Perambalur Taluk (Sub-District/County). The Perambalur district is bounded on the North by Cuddalore and Salem County, South by Trichy County, East by Ariyalur County, West by Trichy and Salem County.

Schools

Government schools
 Government Men's High School, Labbaikudikkadu
 Government Girls High School, Labbaikudikkadu
 Government High School, Nannai
 Government Primary School, Labbaikudikkadu
 Government Model High School, Kilumathur
 Government High School, Varakur
 Government High School, Thambiranpatti
 Government High School, Murugankudi
 Government High School, Veppanthattai
 Government High School, Kadur
 Government High School, Cuddalore
 Government High School, Azure (Perambalur)
 Government High School, North Madhavi
 Government High School, Kavulpalayam Panchayat
 Government High School, Paravai
 Government High School, Nakkasalem
 Government Middle School, Nakkasalem
 Government High School, Ranjan Gudi
 Government High School, Kaikalathur
 Government High School, Ladapuram Panchayat
 Government High School, Perali
 Government High School, Melappuliyur Panchayat
 Government High School, Ammapalayam
 Government High School, Esanai Panchayat
 Government High School, Mela Puliyur
 Government High School, Kurumbalur
 Government High School, Poolambadi
 Government High School, Tungapuram Panchayat
 Government High School, V. Kalathur
 Government High School, Chettikulam
 Government High School, Peelwadi
 Adi Dravidar High School, Kalarampatti
 Panchayat Union Middle School, Kottavasal
 Government High School, Keelapuliyur

Government aided schools
 St. Dominic's Girls' High School, Perambalur
 Nehru High School, Eraiyur
 Thanthai Hans Rover high School, Perambalur
 R.C. St. John's High School, Perambalur
 Maulana High School, Perambalur
 Salamat Middle School, Labbaikudikkadu
 Chidambaram Middle School, Chinnavenmani

Private schools
 Arudra Vidyalaya Matriculation High School, Department Mangalam
 Labbaikkudikkadu Wisdom Matriculation High School, Ayan Peraiyur
 Dhanalakshmi Srinivasan Matriculation High School, (Tamil medium) 
 Dhanalakshmi Srinivasan Matriculation High School, (English medium) 
 Eden Garden Metric High School, Venkanur
 Shanti Niketan Matriculation High School, Arumbavoor
 St. Andrews Metric High School, Thirumanthurai
 St. Valanar Matriculation High School, Elambalur Panchayat
 Annai Matriculation High School, Badalur Panchayat
 Dhanalakshmi Srinivasan Matriculation High School, (State Education System)
 Eden Garden Metric High School, Venkanur,  (State Education System)
 Nalanda High School, Perambalur
 Panimalar High School, Perambalur
 Arivalayam High School, Nakkasalem
 Hayagriva Matriculation High School, Nakkasalem
 Rajavignesh High School, Melamathur Panchayat
 Sri Raghavendra High School, Arumbavoor
 Van Pukal Valluvar High School, Odiyam Panchayat
 Green Park Matriculation Higher Secondary School.

References 

Perambalur
Perambalur district